Afshar Jiq (also Romanized as Afshār Jīq; also known as Afshār Ḩaq, Afshār Jeq, and Ushadik) is a village in Aliabad Rural District, in the Central District of Hashtrud County, East Azerbaijan Province, Iran. At the 2006 census, its population was 459, in 86 families.

References 

Towns and villages in Hashtrud County